Pedro María "Pello" Iguaran Arandia (2 July 1940 – 16 January 2015) was a Spanish football defender.

Iguaran played for Deportivo Alavés in the 1963-1964 season. He signed for Real Sociedad immediately after Alavés was relegated. Iguaran served his new club for 7 years, being in most cases used as a reserve defender. However, he was in the starting 11 that obtained promotion in the historical 1967 match against Calvo Sotelo. He played a total of 85 games for Real Sociedad.

References

External links
 
 Obituary at Real Sociedad's official website

1940 births
2015 deaths
People from Lasarte-Oria
Spanish footballers
Footballers from the Basque Country (autonomous community)
Association football defenders
La Liga players
Segunda División players
Deportivo Alavés players
Real Sociedad footballers